Eojapyx is a genus of diplurans in the family Japygidae.

Species
 Eojapyx pedis Smith, 1960

References

Diplura